The Ahir (Sanskrit: Abhira) is a Hindu caste amongst large set of pastoral communities using Yadav word since late 19th century to early 20th century as part of Sanskritisation process. The Ahir clans are spread almost all over country.

Clans

Yaduvanshi
The Yaduvanshi Ahirs claim descent from the ancient Yadu or Yadava tribe of Krishna.

Nandvanshi
A legendary story of the origin of the Nandvanshi Ahirs narrates that on his way to kill the rakshasas, Krishna crossed the river Yamuna accompanied by the Gawlis; those that crossed the river with him became the Ahir Nandabanshi. Nandvanshi and Yaduvanshi titles are fundamentally synonymous

Gwalvanshi
The Gwalvanshi Ahirs are historically associated with cowherding. According to history professor Rahul Shukla, the Gwalvanshi Ahirs had settled in Azamgarh, Varanasi, Gorkakhpur, Mirzapur etc., besides in Bihar. "They were cultivators or farmers in eastern Uttar Pradesh and Bihar. At the turn of the century, they evolved into business and other vocations in a big way.

Ghosi

The Ghosi are a community found mainly in North India. They were the Zamidaars and small kings of various parts of country. Ghosi trace their origin to King Nand, the professed ancestor of Yaduvanshi Ahirs.

Phatak

The Phatak Ahirs claim to be descended from Digpal, the Ahir Raja of Mahaban.

Ahar

The Ahar are a Hindu caste of agriculturists. The Ahar tribe are spread through Rohilkhand and other districts of N.W. provinces, following pastoral pursuits. They claim to descended from Yadu.

Krishnaut

Kishnaut or Krishnaut are Ahirs clan that inhabits the state of Bihar. They claim to be descendants of Krishna.

Majhraut

The Majhraut are Ahir clan that inhabits the state of Bihar. They claim to be descended from king Madhu.

See also
 Ahir
 Bihari Ahir
 Yaduvanshi
 Narayani Sena

References

 Clans
Caste system in India